Hans Hammer (born 1440 or 1445; died 1519) was a German stonemason, master builder and architect

Hans Hammer may also refer to:

Hans Jørgen Hammer (1815–1882), Danish artist
 Hans von Hammer, lead character in comic series Enemy Ace
Hans Hammer (politician), Austrian politician, mayor of Lafnitz

See also
Hans Hammergafferstein, pseudonym of poet Henry Wadsworth Longfellow (1807–1882)